A.M. Thomas (4 June 1912 – 27 April 2004) was an Indian politician from Kerala and a Indian National Congress leader. He served as Minister of State (Food and Agriculture) in Fourth Nehru ministry, First Nanda ministry and Lal Bahadur Shastri ministry.

Early life 
Alunkal Mathai Thomas was born on June 4, 1912, in the village of Kurikad in Kingdom of Cochin. His father was Mathai. He was educated at St. Thomas College, Thrissur, Maharaja's College, Ernakulam and Law College, Trivandrum. He married Thankam in 1940 and they have four sons and five daughters. Mr. Thomas was a lawyer in Supreme Court. He served as Member of Cochin Legislative Council, Member of Standing Finance Committee. Member of Committee appointed by Cochin Government to enquire into disabilities of Pali tenants and Tenancy, Select Committees, Member of Travancore-Cochin Assembly between 1949 and 1952, Member of Executive Committee of Travancore-Cochin Assembly Congress Parliamentary Party and also Congress Whip from 1949 to 1951, and Speaker of  Travancore-Cochin Legislative Assembly during 1951–52 at an age of 39.

Parliamentary career 
He was elected from Ernakulam to Lok Sabha for three consecutive terms from 1952 to 1962. He Served in a number of important committees constituted by the Parliament and was also the Chairman of the Select Committee on the Rubber Bill. He was Union Deputy Minister of Food and Agriculture from 1957 to 1963.He led Indian Delegation to the United Nations Sugar Conference held in Geneva in 1958 and 1961 and Delegation to Canada and the United States in 1960 as well.

Death 
Thomas died at his residence in Kochi on the morning of 27 April 2004. He was 91.

References

See also
 Minister of Agriculture & Farmers Welfare
 List of members of the 1st Lok Sabha 
 List of members of the 2nd Lok Sabha 
 List of members of the 3rd Lok Sabha 
 Fourth Nehru ministry 
 First Nanda ministry 
 Lal Bahadur Shastri ministry 
 Ernakulam Lok Sabha constituency

1912 births
2004 deaths
20th-century Indian lawyers
Indian National Congress politicians from Kerala
India MPs 1962–1967
India MPs 1957–1962